The 2014 Asian Games torch relay was held from August 13, 2014 and travel through 70 cities for 5,700 km until the opening ceremony. Two cities were elected as the international torch relay leg, they are New Delhi, India on August 9, 2014 and Weihai, China on August 12, 2014, this also marked the first time the Games hosted by South Korea's city to have international torch relay.

The torch was first lit at Dhyan Chand National Stadium in New Delhi, India on August 9, 2014, marked the first time the torch was lit outside the host country. The flame from New Delhi was combined with the Manisan Mountain flame at a ceremony on 13 August 2014 on Ganghwado Island to mark the beginning of the national leg of the relay. Both flames were generated from parabolic mirrors directed straight at the sun.

Route in South Korea

References

2014 Asian Games
Asian Games torch relays